Paul Seidel (11 January 1913 – 11 June 1940) was a German racing cyclist. He rode in the 1938 Tour de France.

References

External links
 

1913 births
1940 deaths
German male cyclists
Place of birth missing
German military personnel killed in World War II
Sportspeople from Hanover
Cyclists from Lower Saxony
Military personnel from Hanover